New Caledonia Baseball Association is the governing body of the sport of baseball within New Caledonia. The current president of the association is Jean DeSittier.

External links
 New Caledonia Baseball Association website

Baseball governing bodies